Šiauliai is the fourth largest city in Lithuania, with a population of 99,462 in 2022. From 1994 to 2010 it was the capital of Šiauliai County.

Names

History

The city was first mentioned in written sources as Soule in Livonian Order chronicles describing the Battle of Saule. Thus the city's founding date is now considered to be 22 September 1236, the same date when the battle took place, not far from Šiauliai. At first, it developed as a defence post against the raids by the Teutonic and Livonian Orders. After the Battle of Grunwald in 1410, the raids stopped and Šiauliai started to develop as an agricultural settlement. In 1445, a wooden church was built. It was replaced in 1625 with the brick church which can be seen in the city center today.

Šiauliai was granted Magdeburg city rights in the 16th century when it also became an administrative centre of the area. However, in the 16th to 18th centuries the city was devastated by The Deluge and epidemics of the Bubonic plague.

The credit for the city's rebirth goes to Antoni Tyzenhaus (1733–1785) who after a violent revolt of peasants of the Crown properties in Northern Lithuania (so-called in Polish: Powstanie Szawelskie, 1769), started the radical economic and urban reforms. He decided to rebuild the city according to the Classicism ideas: at first houses were built randomly in a radial shape, but Tyzenhaus decided to build the city in an orderly rectangular grid. Šiauliai grew to become a well-developed city, with several prominent brick buildings. In 1791 Stanisław August Poniatowski, king of the Polish–Lithuanian Commonwealth, confirmed once again that Šiauliai's city rights and granted it a coat of arms which depicted a bear, the symbol of Samogitia, the Eye of Providence, and a red bull, the symbol of the Poniatowski family. The modern coat of arms has been modelled after this version.

After the Partitions of Poland, Šiauliai received a new coat of arms. The city grew and became an important educational and cultural centre. Also, infrastructure was rapidly developing: in 1836–1858 a road connecting Riga and Tilsit was built, in 1871 a railroad connecting Liepāja with Romny was built. Šiauliai, being in a crossroad of important merchant routes, started to develop as an industrial town. Already in 1897, it was the third-largest city in Lithuania with a population of about 16,000. The demographics changed also: 56.4% of the inhabitants were Jewish in 1909. Šiauliai was known for its leather industry. Chaim Frenkel owned the biggest leather factory in the Russian Empire.

World War I and independent Lithuania

During World War I, about 85% of the buildings were burned down and the city centre was destroyed. After the war and re-establishment of Lithuania, the importance of Šiauliai grew. Before Klaipėda was attached to Lithuania, the city was second after Kaunas by population size. By 1929 the city centre was rebuilt. Modern utilities were also included: streets were lighted, they had public transportation, telephone and telegraph lines, water supply network and sewer.

The first years of independence were difficult because the industrial city lost its markets in Russia. It needed to find new clients in Western Europe. In 1932 a railroad to Klaipėda was built and it connected the city to the Western markets. In 1938, the city produced about 85% of Lithuania's leather, 60% of footwear, 75% of flax fibre, 35% of candies. Culture also flourished as many new periodicals were printed, new schools and universities opened, a library, theatre, museum, and normal school were opened.

World War II

In 1939, one-fifth of the city's population was Jewish. German soldiers entered Šiauliai on June 26, 1941. The first mass murder of Šiauliai Jews was perpetrated in the Kužiai forest, about 12 kilometres outside Šiauliai, on June 29, 1941. According to one of the Jewish survivors of Šiauliai, Nesse Godin, some 700 people were shot in nearby woods during the first weeks of occupation after having been forced to dig their own graves. Beginning on July 29, 1941, and continuing throughout the summer, the Germans murdered about 8,000 Jews from Šiauliai and the Šiauliai region in the Kužiai forest. One hundred twenty-five Jews from Linkuva were also murdered there, along with ethnic Lithuanian and Russian members of the Communist Party and the Communist Youth.

The Šiauliai Ghetto was established in July 1941. There were two Jewish ghetto areas in Šiauliai, one in the Kaukas suburb, and one in Trakų. During World War II, the Jewish population was reduced from 8,000 to 500. Approximately 80% of the buildings were destroyed.

Soviet era

The city was largely rebuilt anew in a typical Soviet fashion during the years of subsequent Soviet occupation.

Mayors

1990–1991 – Kazimieras Šavinis
1991–1995 – Arvydas Salda
1995–2000 – Alfredas Lankauskas
2000–2002 Vida Stasiūnaitė
2002–2003 – Vaclovas Volkovas
2003–2007 – Vytautas Juškus
2007–2011 – Genadijus Mikšys
2011–2015 – Justinas Sartauskas
2015–present – Artūras Visockas

Geography
Šiauliai located in eastern part of the northern plateau, Mūša, Dubysa and Venta River divide. The total city area , from the green areas , water – . Urban land outside perimeter of the administrative .

Water
The total water area – 1,280 ha, 15.7% in urban areas.
 Šiauliai Lakes
 Rėkyva Lake, 1,179 ha
 Talkša Lake, 56.2 ha
 Ginkūnai Lake, 16.6 ha
 Rivers
 Kulpė
 Rūdė
 Vijolė
 Švedė
 Šimša
 Tilžė
 Šventupis

Climate
Under the Köppen climate classification, Šiauliai has a warm-summer humid continental climate (Dfb). The average temperature in January;  in July; +. The amount of precipitation in a year – .

In 1942, the city recorded the lowest Lithuania year mean temperature (+3.6 °C).

Demographics

In 1795, there were 3,700 people living in Šiauliai, rising to 16,128 by 1897, when it was the third-most populous city in Lithuania after Kaunas. The Jewish population of Šiauliai rose steadily through the second half of the nineteenth century, from 2,565 in 1847 to around 7,000 at century's end. By the outbreak of World War I, 12,000 of the town's inhabitants were Jews, making Šiauliai majority Jewish.
A battlefield during the Great War, Šiauliai saw thousands of its citizens flee, never to return.

In 1923, Šiauliai population's was third to that of Kaunas and Klaipėda.

Economy

Beginning in the 19th century, Šiauliai became an industrial centre. During the Russian Empire period, the city had the largest leather factory in the whole empire, owned by Chaim Frenkel. Šiauliai contributed to around 85% of all leather production in Lithuania, 60% of the footwear industry, 75% of the flax fibre industry, and 35% of the sweets industry.

During the Soviet years, the city produced electronics (Nuklonas), mechanical engineering, wood processing, construction industry. Most of the industrial enterprises were concentrated in urban areas.

According to 2005 data, the city has:

 Manufacturing and service companies – 3195
 Commercial enterprises – 781
 Shopping centres – 30, including
 Akropolis, opened March 2009
 Saulės Miestas, opened March 2007
 Bruklinas, opened November 2007
 Tilžė, opened February 2008
 Arena, opened November 2007
In 2020, construction of Europe's largest aircraft maintenance and repair centre will begin on the territory of Šiauliai International Airport. The related company will repair Airbus A320, Boeing 737 Classic, Boeing 737 Next Generation aircraft and will also provide aircraft administration and parking services. It is planned that the centre will create 1000 new workplaces.

Education

 1851 Boys' Gymnasium (now Julius Janonis Gymnasium) was opened
 1898 Girls' Gymnasium (now Didždvaris Gymnasium) was opened
 1920 Jewish Gymnasium was opened
 1920 Šiauliai Teachers seminary was founded
 1928 Primary education became compulsory
 1930 Vincas Kudirka primary school was opened
 1939 The Institute of trade was moved from Klaipėda, it was the first Higher Education school in Šiauliai
 1948 Šiauliai Teachers Institute was founded, in 1954 it became Pedagogical Institute, and since 1996, when the Šiauliai faculty of Kaunas Polytechnic Institute was connected, it is Šiauliai University. In 2021 Šiauliai University was reorganised to Vilnius University Šiauliai Academy.

Students in the city (in 2006):
 In Šiauliai University – 10,440
 In Šiauliai College – 2,770
 In Northern Lithuania College – 700
 In Šiauliai region College of Management and Languages – 517
 In Šiauliai Conservatory – 149
 In Šiauliai Vocational Training Center – 2,663

There are 8 gymnasiums, 7 high schools, 16 secondary schools, 7 primary schools, 9 children's non-formal education schools, 29 kindergartens. 21,000 students studied in general education schools in 2006.

Parks

The city park to the creation of Anton Tyzenhaus essentially graduated Vladimir Zubov. The 19th-century park was of a rectangular shape and was similar to English-style freely designed parks. For a small fee, citizens were allowed to walk in the park. In 1931, the Park and Alley chestnut was officially donated to the Šiauliai city municipality.

Šiauliai has 16 parks, covering an area of 1,177 hectares. Didždvario province and Rėkyvos parks add to the cultural values of the registry.

Transport

Šiauliai has always been a major intersection. The famous Saulės battle took place near a trade route from Riga to Bubiai and Tauragė.In 1836–1858 Riga–Tilsit (Sovetsk) highway was built near it. About 1912, first cars appeared on city's streets.

Highways passing through Šiauliai :
 A9 / E272 Šiauliai – Panevėžys (79 km)
 A11 / E272 Šiauliai – Palanga (147 km)
 A12 / E77 Riga – Šiauliai – Sovetsk (186 km).
 City has is western bypass A18.

In 2006, Šiauliai had  of roads, of which 32% had a gravel surface.

In 1871, the Liepaja-Romny railway was built. The Tilžė–Riga and Šiauliai–Klaipeda railways were built in 1916 and 1931, respectively. The city has a railway station.

In 1930, an air strip was developed. It was expanded in 1961 during the Soviet period and developed into a large VVS base. It is now a military base for NATO, and home to the Šiauliai International Airport.

The first passenger transport company in Šiauliai was founded in 1940.  It was Autotrestas, which had 29 buses. In 1944 a motor firm replaced Autotrestas. In 1947 the first taxi company, Šiauliai cars, appeared. Subsequently, to meet the needs of an increasing population, more busses and Taksomotorų Autoūkis were added in 1955. In 2006, a modern bus station with a trade centre was constructed. The city has 27 city routes, the maximum number is 29.

Communications

Šiauliai of communication in 1897 could be used not only for mail or telegraph, and telephone. Telephone subscribers in 1923 was 170, while in 1937 – 700 rooms. 1936; the city to install a phone machine. 

1957, a television tower, which are equipped with radio and antenna lines. In 1995 launched the construction of cable television lines, 1998 started to install the cable internet, since 2003 – Optical Internet line. In 2008 the city has 14 post offices (central LT-76001).

Sport

Since 1924 soccer was played in Šiauliai. By the year 1936 there were 14 soccer teams in the city. Later other sports also started to be played professionally: basketball, handball, rugby, hockey, athletics, cycling, boxing and other sports. On July 25, 2007, in preparation for the 37th European men basketball championship, a modern Šiauliai Arena was opened to the public.

Twin towns – sister cities

Šiauliai is twinned with:

 Częstochowa, Poland
 Etten-Leur, Netherlands
 Fredericia, Denmark
 Jelgava, Latvia
 Khmelnytsky, Ukraine
 Kristianstad, Sweden
 Omaha, United States
 Pärnu, Estonia
 Plauen, Germany

The city was previously twinned with:
 Baranavichy, Belarus
 Kaliningrad, Russia

Notable people 

According to the population census of 2001, ethnic Lithuanians comprise 93%, Russians – 5%, and the remaining 2% consist of Ukrainians, Belarusians, Jews, Roma, Latvians, Armenians and other ethnic groups. About 94% of the city's population consider Lithuanian their native language, 5% are Russian speakers and the remainder speak Ukrainian, Belarusian, Latvian, Roma, Armenian etc. About 80% of those older than 20 have a command of the Russian language, while only 17% can speak English and 7% – German.

The list of notable people who were born in Šiauliai:

 Regimantas Adomaitis, movie and stage actor, born here
 André Andrejew, a classic Russian and French movie art director, born here
 Šarūnas Bartas, film director, born here
 Ligia B. Bieliukas, WWII underground member, clubwoman
 Wojciech Buyko, Polish classic photographer, born here in 1882 (†1942?)
 Virgilijus Noreika, opera singer, born here
 Yosef Shalom Eliashiv (image), rabbi, and grandson of a kabbalist Rabbi Shalom Ben Hayim Haikel Eliashiv zt"l (Leshem), a native of this city
 Jacob Gens, self-proclaimed Vilnius Ghetto police commander under the Nazi occupation (1941–1943), born here (1903)
 Tobias Dantzig American mathematician and author.
 Nesse Godin, Shoah survivor and Shoah awareness advocate in the United States.
 Robertas Javtokas, professional basketball player
 Olga Jegunova, classical pianist
 Veniamin Kagan, mathematician specializing in geometry
 Samuel Kessel, father of Joseph Kessel, physician was born here
 Igor Kisiel, scientist, professor at the Technical University of Wroclaw, born in Illovieciai near Šiauliai
 Anton Luckievič, Belarusian publisher, journalist and politician who served as the Prime Minister of the Belarusian People's Republic in 1918.
 Ivan Luckievič, leading figure of the Belarusian independence movement in the early 20th century, publicist and archaeologist.
 Albrycht Stanisław Radziwiłł, magnate, noble, a duke and a politician. He held the post of Starosta (city foreman) of this city.
 Jan Sawicki-Stella, colonel in the Russian army who during the insurrection against Russia in 1863, went to fight on the Polish-Lithuanian side, born here
 Meyer Schapiro, art historian, born here
 Henrietta Schumann, concert pianist, born here in 1909 before emigrating to America in 1924. 
 Antanas Sireika, born near Šiauliai was a coach for a hometown basketball team for many seasons.
 Olegas Truchanas, Lithuanian photographer, went to school here, recognized in Australia for his ecological conscious photography
 Wiktoryn Witkiewicz, father of the legendary Russian envoy to Afghanistan Jan Prosper Witkiewicz, has been the Vice-Marshall of Šiauliai in Kingdom of Poland
 Mindaugas Žukauskas, professional basketball player was born here
 Marius Žaromskis, mixed martial artist fighter
 Dovilė Dzindzaletaitė, athlete triple jumper, Lithuanian national record holder and former European Under-23 Champion, World Junior silver medalist, wife of British former World Indoor 60 metres champion Richard Kilty.

Significant depictions in popular culture
 Šiauliai is one of the starting towns of Lithuania in the turn-based strategy game Medieval II: Total War: Kingdoms.

See also 
 BC Šiauliai
 Telshe yeshiva
 Hill of Crosses

References

External links

Šiauliai Tourism Information Centre
 "Here Their Stories Will Be Told..." The Valley of the Communities at Yad Vashem, Siauliai, at Yad Vashem website
 

 
Municipalities of Šiauliai County
Cities in Lithuania
Cities in Šiauliai County
Capitals of Lithuanian counties
Duchy of Samogitia
Shavelsky Uyezd
Municipalities administrative centres of Lithuania
Holocaust locations in Lithuania